In rhetoric, antonomasia is a kind of metonymy in which an epithet or phrase takes the place of a proper name, such as "the little corporal" for Napoleon I, or conversely the use of a proper name as an archetypal name, to express a generic idea. A frequent instance of antonomasia in the Late Middle Ages and early Renaissance was the use of the term "the Philosopher" to refer to Aristotle. A more recent example of the other form of antonomasia (usage of archetypes) was the use of "Solons" for "the legislators" in 1930s journalism, after the semi-legendary Solon, lawgiver of Athens.

Stylistically, such epithets may be used for elegant variation to reduce repetition of names in phrases. The word comes from the Greek , antonomasia, itself from the verb , antonomazein 'to name differently'.

Opposite examples 
See "archetypal name" for examples of the opposite kind of antonomasia.

Examples

Persons
 "El Caudillo" for Francisco Franco
 "El Jefe" for Rafael Trujillo
 "Il Duce" for Benito Mussolini
 "La Divina" for Maria Callas
 "La Stupenda" for Joan Sutherland
 "Man of Steel" or simply "Steel" for Joseph Stalin
 "Mr. Soul" for Sam Cooke
 "Old Blue Eyes" or "The Chairman of the Board" for Frank Sinatra
 "Pelides" or "the son of Peleus" for Achilles
 "Son of Laertes" or "Man of Pain" for Odysseus
 "The (Great) Bambino" for Babe Ruth
 "The Bard" for William Shakespeare
 "The Big Bopper" for Jiles Perry Richardson, Jr
 "The Boss" for Bruce Springsteen
 "The Commentator" for Averroes (so named for his commentaries on "The Philosopher" Aristotle's works)
 "The Don" for Sir Donald Bradman
 "The Fab Four" for The Beatles
 "The First Lady of Song" for Ella Fitzgerald
 "The Führer" for Adolf Hitler
 "The Genius of the Carpathians" for Nicolae Ceausescu (note that this is only used ironically)
 "The Gipper" or "The Great Communicator" for Ronald Reagan
 "The Great Commoner" for Winston Churchill
 "The Great Emancipator" or "Honest Abe" for Abraham Lincoln
 "The Great Silent One" for Helmuth von Moltke the Elder
 "The Greatest" for Muhammad Ali
 "The Hardest Working Man in Show Business" or "Soul Brother Number 1" or “The Godfather of Soul” for James Brown
 "The High Priestess of Soul" for Nina Simone
 "The Iron Chancellor" for Otto von Bismarck
 "The Iron Lady" or "The Leaderene" for Margaret Thatcher
 "Radical Jack" for John Lambton, 1st Earl of Durham
 "The King of Pop" for Michael Jackson
 "The King of Rock 'n Roll" for Elvis Presley
 "The Little Corporal" or "Corsican Ogre" for Napoleon
 "The Little Master" for Sachin Tendulkar
 "The Mahatma" for Mohandas Gandhi
 "The Master of Suspense" for Alfred Hitchcock
 "The Prince of Darkness" for William Francis Galvin
 "The Queen of Pop" or "The Material Girl" for Madonna
 "The Little Private" for Adolf Hitler before the Machtergreifung
 "The Queen of Soul" for Aretha Franklin
 "The Red Baron" for Manfred von Richthofen
 "The Shah" for Shah Mohammad Reza Pahlavi
 "The Stagirite" or "The Philosopher" for Aristotle
 "The Steel Butterfly" for Imelda Marcos
 "The Tiger of Mysore" for Tipu Sultan
 “El Libertador” for Simón Bolívar

Fictional characters
 "The Boy Who Lived" for Harry Potter
 "The Banshee Queen" for Sylvanas Windrunner
 "The Dark Knight" or "The Caped Crusader" for Batman (also referred as "The Dynamic Duo"  when paired with fictional sidekick, Robin)
 "The Man of Steel" or the "Man of Tomorrow" for Superman
 "The Mother of Dragons" for Daenerys Targaryen
 "The Ring Bearer" for Frodo Baggins
 "The Master of Disguise" for Pistachio Disguisey
 "The Mad Titan" for Thanos

Works of art
 "The Scottish play" for Macbeth

Places
 "The Athens of America" for Boston
 "Auld Reekie" for Edinburgh
 "The Big Apple" for New York City
 "The Big Easy" for New Orleans
 "The City by the Bay" for San Francisco
 "The City of Brotherly Love" for Philadelphia
 "City of Dreams" for Mumbai
 "The City of Hundred Gates" for ancient Thebes, Egypt
 "The City of Kings" for Lima, Peru
 "The City of Light" for Paris
 "The City of Palaces" for Mexico City
 "The Eternal City" or "Urbe" for Rome
 "La Dominante," "La Serenissima," "Queen of the Adriatic," "City of Water," "City of Masks," "City of Bridges," "The Floating City," and "City of Canals" for Venice
 "La La Land" for Los Angeles
 "The Red Stick" for Baton Rouge
 "The Smoke" for London
 "The South American Athens" for Bogotá
 "The White City" for the World's Columbian Exposition
 "The Windy City" for Chicago
 "The Emerald City" for the fictional Land of Oz
 ":de:Elbflorenz" (Florence of the Elbe) for Dresden

See also 
 Eponym
 Sobriquet
 Synecdoche
 Trademark erosion
 Honorific nicknames in popular music

References

External links

Rhetorical techniques